The Vaia is a left tributary of the river Niraj in Romania. Near Acățari it flows into the Vețca canal, which discharges into the Niraj in Cinta.

References

Rivers of Romania
Rivers of Mureș County